Suthaliya is a town and a nagar panchayat in Rajgarh district in the Indian state of Madhya Pradesh.

Demographics
 India census, Suthaliya had a population of 9,456. Males constitute 53% of the population and females 47%. Suthaliya has an average literacy rate of 50%, lower than the national average of 59.5%: male literacy is 62%, and female literacy is 37%. In Suthaliya, 18% of the population is under 6 years of age.

Religion
In Suthaliya, there are two temples of Mahadev at high peaks, temples known as Balkeshwar Mahadev and Shyamkho Mahadev. There are also temples of Maa Durga, Hanuman ji Maharaj, and Vaishnodevi in the town.

References

Cities and towns in Rajgarh district
Rajgarh, Madhya Pradesh